Baru is an extinct genus of crocodile (subfamily Mekosuchinae) that emerged in Australia during the Upper Oligocene.

Baru may also refer to:

Places 
 Baru, Sichuan, a town in Xichang, Sichuan, China
 Baru, Iran, a village in Tehran Province, Iran
 Baru, Hunedoara, a commune in Hunedoara County, Romania
 Baroo, a town in the Punjab province of Pakistan
 Volcán Barú, a volcano in Panama
 Baru, Rajasthan, a small village in Rajasthan, India
 Isla Barú, an island in Colombia

Other uses 
 Bārû, a priestly class in ancient Mesopotamia
 Baru seed, an edible legume seed native to South America, Dipteryx alata
 Baru tree, a primitive legume tree from the early branch Dipterygeae, Dipteryx alata
 Triodia wiseana, a bunchgrass species in the genus Triodia
 Baru Cormorant, the protagonist of the novel The Traitor Baru Cormorant